Liam Adams (born 4 September 1986, Melbourne) is an Australian runner. He competed in the Summer Olympics in 2016 in Rio de Janeiro and qualified for the Tokyo 2020 Olympics. Adams came 24th in the Men's marathon in a time of 2:15.51, 7 minutes behind the winner, Eliud Kipchoge of Kenya.

Early years 
Adams was a very sporty and competitive child. He was advised by his primary school teacher to try cross country.

In his second year, Adams won a medal in the nationals but it was only after a few years later that he decided to his training seriously. He began training with local coach Gregor Gojrzewski and this had a significant impact on his career.

As a 17 year old, in 2004, Adams won the national junior 5000m championship. Later that year he won the national junior cross country title. He finished his junior career with a personal best in the 5000m of 14:30.

Achievements
Adams has taken part in several IAAF World Cross Country Championships with his best placing being in 2013 coming in 23rd place. In July 2012 he won the Gold Coast Half Marathon by finishing in front of Harry Summers and Shinichi Yamashita. In October 2018 he won the Melbourne Marathon.
2007: 102nd, IAAF World Cross Country Championships, Mombasa, Kenya
2008: 69th, IAAF World Cross Country Championships, Edinburgh, Great Britain
2009: 69th, IAAF World Cross Country Championships, Amman, Jordan
2010: 37th, IAAF World Cross Country Championships, Bydgoszcz, Poland
2011: 79th, IAAF World Cross Country Championships, Punta Umbría, Spain
2012: 1st, Gold Coast Half Marathon, Gold Coast, Queensland, Australia
2014: 7th, Commonwealth Games Marathon
2016: 5th, Orlen Warsaw Marathon
2016: 31st, Olympic Games Marathon Rio de Janeiro
2017: 9th, Berlin Marathon
2018: 5th, Commonwealth Games Marathon
2018: 1st, Melbourne Marathon
2018: 2nd, Kobe Marathon
2019: 1st, Sydney Morning Herald Half Marathon
2019: 6th, Gold Coast Marathon
2020: 13th, Lake Biwa Marathon
2021: 24th, Olympic Games Marathon Sapporo
2022: 4th, Commonwealth Games Marathon

Personal bests

References

External links
 
 
 Liam Adams at Athletics Australia
 Liam Adams at Australian Athletics Historical Results
 
 
 
 
 
 

1986 births
Living people
Australian male long-distance runners
Australian male cross country runners
Australian male marathon runners
Commonwealth Games competitors for Australia
Athletes (track and field) at the 2014 Commonwealth Games
Olympic athletes of Australia
Athletes (track and field) at the 2016 Summer Olympics
Athletes (track and field) at the 2020 Summer Olympics
20th-century Australian people
21st-century Australian people
Athletes (track and field) at the 2022 Commonwealth Games
Athletes from Melbourne